Bottega may refer to:

 Bottega Veneta, an Italian luxury fashion house
 Bottega Giotti, a Florence-based fashion company specializing in woven leather jackets, bags and small leather goods
 Bottega Louie, a Los Angeles-based Italian restaurant, gourmet market, and French patisserie
 Bottega University, a distance-learning university headquartered in Salt Lake City, Utah
 The Jeweller's Shop (also known simply as Bottega dell'orefice in Italian), a 1988 Italian-Austrian-Canadian-German drama film
 La Bottega dell'Arte (also known simply as Bottega dell'Arte), an Italian pop music group active between 1974 and 1985

See also 
 Bodega (disambiguation)